Imamzadeh Qasem is a Imamzadeh in Khalilabad County, Razavi Khorasan Province in Iran.

Sources 

Mosques in Iran
Tourist attractions in Razavi Khorasan Province